Ben McIntosh (born May 28, 1991, in Coquitlam, British Columbia, Canada) is a lacrosse player for the Philadelphia Wings in the National Lacrosse League and Waterdogs Lacrosse Club in the Premier Lacrosse League.

Professional career

NLL career
Ben McIntosh was selected first overall in the 2015 National Lacrosse League Entry Draft by the Edmonton Rush who had received the pick in a trade with the Minnesota Swarm. In his rookie season in the National Lacrosse League McIntosh had a tremendous initial season collecting 37 goals, 49 assist and 86 points in his 18 starts with the Rush. McIntosh won 2015 NLL's rookie of the year award with seven first place votes and also helped lead the Rush to its first NLL title. The Rush won the 2016 and 2018 Champion's Cup as well, while reaching the finals in 2017. McIntosh was traded in mid-2020 to the Philadelphia Wings for Josh Currier.

Stats reference:

WLA career
McIntosh was also the first overall selection in the 2013 Western Lacrosse Association draft. He played for the Maple Ridge Burrards.

PLL career
In 2019, McIntosh started playing for Archers Lacrosse Club in Paul Rabil’s PLL inaugural season. In the 2020 expansion draft, he was picked up by the Waterdogs.

MLL career
Ben McIntosh was selected with the sixty second pick in the eighth round by the Denver Outlaws in the 2014 Major League Lacrosse Collegiate Draft. Although being drafted by Denver that year, McIntosh wouldn't make a single appearance that season. The following season a MLL Supplemental Draft was called upon to increase the roster size from 23 to 35. McIntosh was available to be drafted and was by the Chesapeake Bayhawks with the seventy fifth pick of the draft.

Prep and College Career
McIntosh prepped at Western Reserve Academy where he was first team All Midwest in lacrosse, and also a well regarded center on their ice hockey team. McIntosh was a teammate of NCAA Goaltender of the Year, Kyle Bernlohr.

At Drexel University, McIntosh was a two time All American and led Drexel to its first ever NCAA tournament appearance as well as the 2014 NCAA Quarterfinals. McIntosh is the single season record holder for goals at Drexel with 48 in 2014.

NCAA Statistics

See also
Drexel Dragons men's lacrosse

References

https://web.archive.org/web/20150530032508/http://laxmagazine.com/mll/2014-15/news/121614_notable_names_in_2014_major_league_lacrosse_supplemental_draft_pool Retrieved 2015-05-29.

External links
 Official Twitter
 NLL Pointstreak Statistics

1991 births
Living people
Drexel Dragons men's lacrosse players
Saskatchewan Rush players
Edmonton Rush players
Chesapeake Bayhawks players
Canadian lacrosse players
Premier Lacrosse League players
Lacrosse people from Ontario